St. Charles Seminary may refer to:

 St. Charles Seminary, former American Catholic seminary in Carthagena, Ohio, United States
 St. Charles Borromeo Seminary, Roman Catholic seminary in Wynnewood, Pennsylvania, United States
 St Charles Borromeo Seminary, Roman Catholic Major Seminary in Košice, Slovakia